Jatun Wila Qullu (Quechua jatun, hatun big, great, Aymara wila red or blood, qullu mountain, "great red mountain", hispanicized spelling Jatun Wila Kkollu, Jatun Willa Kollu) is a mountain in the Andes in Bolivia, about 5,214 m (17,106 ft) high. It is located south east of Poopó Lake in the Oruro Department, Challapata Province, Quillacas Municipality, Soraga Canton, east of Sevaruyo and near the border to the Potosí Department.

See also
 Ch'iyar Jaqhi
 Kuntur Nasa
 Wila Qullu
 List of mountains in the Andes

References 

Mountains of Oruro Department
Five-thousanders of the Andes